Quinqueloculininae is a subfamily in the family Miliolidae of miliolid foraminifera.

References

External links
 search "TSN" Quinqueloculininae on www.itis.gov

Tubothalamea
Bikont subfamilies